Kathryn Madlyn Ainsworth (born Kathryn Madlyn Capomacchia) was an American Ku Klux Klan terrorist.

Early life
Kathryn Madlyn Ainsworth was born Kathryn Madlyn Capomacchia on July 31, 1941. Capomacchia was raised by her mother, who was known to have anti-Semitic views. She introduced Kathy to the works of far-right political organizer Gerald L. K. Smith, founder of the Christian Nationalist Crusade and member of the Silver Legion of America.

Kathy was a devout churchgoer. She taught Sunday school and sang in choir at Coral Baptist Church in Miami.

Capomacchia attended college at Mississippi College in Clinton, Mississippi. In the spring of 1960, she roomed with Bonnie Barnes, the daughter of extremist Sidney Crockett Barnes - a devoted follower of Wesley Swift.  In the years between graduation and marriage, Kathy Capomacchia and her mother were frequent guests at the Barnes home in Mobile, Alabama where she met her future lover, Thomas Albert Tarrants III (born December 20, 1946) of Mobile, Alabama.

Around the summer of 1967, Kathy Capomacchia married Ralph Ainsworth.

Radicalism
Ainsworth and her companion, Thomas Tarrants, were both members of the White Knights of the Ku Klux Klan, one of the most militant white resistance organizations during the Civil Rights era. Ainsworth, herself, was also a member of two additional KKK groups: the Original Knights of the Ku Klux Klan and the United Klans of America - as well as a Klan front called Americans for the Preservation of the White Race.

According to police sources and numerous acquaintances of the two, older fanatics had influenced Kathy and Thomas with propaganda and hate material that came from organizations in Arizona, California, New Jersey and other states.

Unbeknownst to her husband, Ainsworth began training in firearms and explosives in 1967. He was aware of his wife's Klan connections, but not of her deep involvement.

Congregation Beth Israel bombing
On May 28, 1968, Ainsworth, along with Tarrants, had participated in the bombing of the Congregation Beth Israel in 1968.

Death
Early on the morning of June 30, 1968, Kathy Ainsworth and Thomas Tarrants drove to the home of Meyer Davidson planning to place a bomb on the side of his house below where they believed his bedroom to be. Ainsworth waited in their car while Tarrants attempted to blow up Davidson's home with a homemade bomb consisting of 29 sticks of dynamite. 

Los Angeles Times reporter Jack Nelson documented the payment of $36,500 by ADL director Adolph Botnick, acting as agent provocateur, to two Klansmen, Raymond and Alton Wayne Roberts, in order to set up Tarrants in an ambush organized by the FBI and local police. A bloody shootout took place, Ainsworth was shot in the neck and died immediately. A loaded pistol and a KKK membership card was found in her purse. Right wing literature from groups including the Minutemen and the National States Rights Party was found during a search of her home.

Tarrants survived numerous wounds and was sentenced to 30 years, but gained early release in 1976. The car's owner was identified to be Danny Joe Hawkins, a Ku Klux Klan hitman who had helped bomb Beth Israel.

References

1941 births
1968 deaths
Criminals from Chicago
Deaths by firearm in Mississippi
Mississippi College alumni
Terrorist incidents in the United States by perpetrator
American Ku Klux Klan members
People shot dead by law enforcement officers in the United States